Summering is a 2022 American coming-of-age drama film co-written, directed, and produced by James Ponsoldt. It stars Lia Barnett, Lake Bell, Sarah Cooper, Ashley Madekwe, Madalen Mills, Megan Mullally, Eden Grace Redfield, and Sanai Victoria. It was released on August 12, 2022, by Bleecker Street.

Cast
 Lia Barnett as Daisy
 Madalen Mills as Dina
 Eden Grace Redfield as Mari
 Sanai Victoria as Lola
 Megan Mullally as Stacie
 Lake Bell as Laura
 Ashley Madekwe as Joy
 Sarah Cooper as Karna
 Dale McKeel as Daisy's Dad
 Willow Corner-Bettwieser as Carol

Release
In August 2021, it was announced that Bleecker Street and Stage 6 Films have acquired American and international distribution rights to the film respectively.

The film premiered at the Sundance Film Festival on January 22, 2022. It was originally scheduled to be released on July 15, 2022 and it was delayed by August 12, 2022.

Reception
The film has a 35% approval rating on Rotten Tomatoes based on 66 reviews, with an average rating of 4.8/10. The website's critics consensus reads: "Summering is a harmless enough coming-of-age story, but there are far superior -- and far less saccharine -- entries in this crowded genre." Metacritic rated the film a 50 out of 100 based on 17 critic reviews, indicating "mixed or average reviews".

Pete Hammond of Deadline Hollywood gave the film a positive review and wrote, "There are things to talk about after the movie ends. And it doesn’t ever talk down to its intended audience. If anything, the adults are the ones desperately in need of connecting with their inner kid." Fred Topel of United Press International also gave the film a positive review and wrote, "Summering is like a female Amblin movie."

Guy Lodge of Variety gave the film a negative review and wrote, "Too much of Summering, however, plays out in an unsatisfying middle ground: embedded neither in real life, nor in its heroines’ restless, malleable imaginations." Angie Han of The Hollywood Reporter also gave the film a negative review and wrote, "But alas, its potential for magic is dulled by uneven performances, unconvincing chemistry and an uninspiring script." Natalia Winkelman of IndieWire graded the film a C- and wrote, "As is, Summering is too scattered and silly for us to really care."

References

External links
 
 

2022 films
2022 drama films
American coming-of-age drama films
2022 independent films
Films directed by James Ponsoldt
2020s coming-of-age drama films
2020s English-language films
2020s American films